The U.S. Farm Report (USFR) is a weekly syndicated United States television news program, presented in magazine format, which has a focus on agriculture and agribusiness.

USFR is currently hosted by Tyne Morgan and is based in South Bend, Indiana, along with its daily companion series, AgDay.  The program is owned by Farm Journal Media, a Philadelphia-based company that owns a number of agricultural media properties including Farm Journal magazine.

Streaming full USFR episodes are available on the station's web site.

Format
Common topics covered on USFR include market forecasts for various agricultural commodities, weather, agricultural business profiles, and some environmental conservation. The U.S. Farm Report is commonly broadcast in the early mornings on Saturdays or Sundays, but some stations show the program at different times.

Each week, two separate half-hour versions of USFR are produced, each with a different focus. Television stations can air either one of the half-hour shows as a stand-alone program or air both shows back-to-back as a single one-hour program. Most stations air the full-hour show.

The first half-hour is aimed at producers (particularly those who produce the "cash crops" of corn, wheat, and soybeans) and focuses heavily on agribusiness and the discussion of market futures, along with a precipitation forecast.  The five segments consist of top stories with news anchor Scott Kinrade, two market-related discussion segments in a roundtable format with Agribusiness Director and Substitute Anchor Al Pell, a seven-day weather and climate forecast (geared at farmers and focusing on precipitation) with WNDU meteorologist Matt Engelbrecht, and commentary by former host John Phipps.

The second half-hour is aimed at consumers, with stories on current events, discussion of agriculture-related consumer items, and rural life, as well as a more general national weather forecast.  The five segments consist of top stories with Scott Kinrade/weather with Matt Engelbrecht, a feature story known as "Spirit of the Heartland", Machinery Minute, Tractor Tales/Country Church Salute, and responses to viewer mail.

History
USFR was founded in 1975 by longtime Tribune farm broadcaster Orion Samuelson, who produced and hosted it until 2005. At that time, the show changed its name to U.S. Farm Report - Town and Country Living, attempting to expand into such items as outdoor sports and recreation, but it soon reverted to its original title and format.

Tribune acquired agricultural magazine Farm Journal in 1993; when Farm Journal was acquired by its management in 1997, Farm Journal Media became the new producer of USFR. Production was merged with the daily farm news program AgDay under Farm Journal ownership.

USFR was distributed by Tribune Entertainment and carried on Superstation WGN until the end of 2007; at that time, Tribune Entertainment ceased operations, and Superstation WGN became WGN America, replacing the show with sitcom reruns; in 2021, the channel transitioned to NewsNation.

In 2009, RFD-TV picked up the show, and airs the program twice weekly, on Saturday mornings and Sunday afternoons. Orion Samuleson and Max Armstrong have had a longtime working relationship with RFD-TV even before the move of USFR. They later moved to a competing program with a similar format, This Week in Agribusiness, which airs on many of the same stations as USFR; Armstrong still co-hosts that program as of 2021, with Samuelson having retired from broadcasting the previous year.

In 2010, Investigating Free Money, which is a Kevin Trudeau production, aired on Fox through USFR.

References

External links

U.S. Farm Report, Tribune Entertainment
U.S. Farm Report channel listings

Agriculture in the United States
Environmental television
1975 American television series debuts
1980s American television news shows
1990s American television news shows
2000s American television news shows
2010s American television news shows
First-run syndicated television programs in the United States
Television series by Tribune Entertainment
English-language television shows
RFD-TV original programming